Ibraahim Guure, or simply Guure, is a Somali lawmaker and former deputy minister for the Development and Natural Resources department of the Khatumo State from 2012 until 2015.

See also
Politics of Somalia

References

Somalian politicians
Living people
Year of birth missing (living people)